Thabo Piet Meeko is a South African politician who has represented the African National Congress (ANC) in the Free State Provincial Legislature since 2014. He was first elected to the provincial legislature in the 2014 general election, ranked 15th on the ANC's provincial party list, and he was re-elected in the 2019 general election, ranked 16th. During that period he has also served as spokesperson for the ANC's Free State branch. 

In March 2023, Meeko was appointed as Member of the Executive Council (MEC) for Small Business Development, Tourism and Environmental Affairs.

References

External links 
 

Living people
Year of birth missing (living people)
Members of the Free State Provincial Legislature
African National Congress politicians
21st-century South African politicians